Kanyar Pyo Nae Zayar Ao is a 1972 Burmese black-and-white drama film, directed by Bake Ka Lar Tae Ngan Pyar Yay starring Kawleikgyin Ne Win, Kyaw Hein, Khin Than Nu and San Shar Tin.

Plot
Dr. Aung Zeya (Kawleikgyin Ne Win) is the legal guardian of Kyaw Kyaw (Kyaw Hein). Kyaw Kyaw has started to date an actress, Win Pa Pa (Khin Than Nu). Dr. Aung and his wife, Htar, do not approve of the youngsters relationship.
Later, the actress tries to flirt with the doctor and he falls for it. Hilarity & frustration ensue as the older man tries to conceal the affair from his wife, his work and social circle.

Cast
Kawleikgyin Ne Win as Dr. Aung Zeya
Kyaw Hein as Kyaw Kyaw
Khin Than Nu as Win Pa Pa
San Shar Tin as Htar
Khin Lay Swe as Wai Wai
Myint Pe as Shwe Ao

References

1972 films
1970s Burmese-language films
Burmese black-and-white films
Films shot in Myanmar
1972 drama films
Burmese drama films